Andrew Sims (1938-2022) of St James's Hospital, Leeds, was president of the Royal College of Psychiatrists from 1990 to 1993. He was Professor of Psychiatry at the University of Leeds.  He wrote a textbook on descriptive psychopathology titled "Symptoms in the Mind" now titled "Sim's Symptoms in the Mind" and in its 6th edition written by Femi Oyebode.

Early life and Education 
He are up in Exeter and then went on to read Medicine at Emmanuel College, Cambridge and Westminster Hospital Medical School. He completed his  postgraduate training in psychiatry at the University of Manchester, and in Birmingham. In 1974 he earned his MD from the  University of Cambridge for his thesis on prognosis in neurotic disorders.

Personal life 
He had a wife is Dr Ruth Sims who is also a psychiatrist and he had four children including Dr David Sims and 12 grandchildren. A memorial service for Professor Sims  on Friday 17 March at 2.30pm at St. George’s Church, Great George Street, Leeds, LS1 3BR.

References 

British psychiatrists
Fellows of the Royal College of Psychiatrists
Living people
Year of birth missing (living people)